Mia Muusfeldt (born 30 July 1979) is a Danish swimmer. She competed in the women's 200 metre freestyle event at the 1996 Summer Olympics.

References

External links
 

1979 births
Living people
Olympic swimmers of Denmark
Swimmers at the 1996 Summer Olympics
Danish female freestyle swimmers
People from Greve Municipality
Sportspeople from Region Zealand